Amin Maalouf (born 25 February 1949) is a Lebanese-born French author who has lived in France since 1976. Although his native language is Arabic, he writes in French, and his works have been translated into over 40 languages. 

Of his several works of nonfiction, The Crusades through Arab Eyes is probably the best known. He received the Prix Goncourt in 1993 for his novel The Rock of Tanios, as well as the 2010 Prince of Asturias Award for Literature. He is a member of the Académie française.

Background

Maalouf was born in Beirut, Lebanon, and grew up in the Badaro cosmopolitan neighborhood, the second of four children. His parents had different cultural backgrounds. His father was from the Melkite Catholic community near the village of Baskinta in Ain el Qabou. His mother, Odette Ghossein, is Lebanese from the Metn Village of Ain el Kabou. She was born in Egypt and lived there for many years before coming back to Lebanon; she lived in France until her passing in 2021 at the age of 100 years.

Maalouf's mother was a staunch Maronite Catholic who insisted on sending him to Collège Notre Dame de Jamhour, a French Jesuit school. He studied sociology at the Francophone Université Saint-Joseph in Beirut.

He is the uncle of trumpeter Ibrahim Maalouf.

Career

Maalouf worked as the director of An-Nahar, a Beirut-based daily newspaper, until the start of the Lebanese civil war in 1975, when he moved to Paris, which became his permanent home. Maalouf's first book, The Crusades Through Arab Eyes (1983), examines the period on the basis of contemporaneous Arabic sources.

Along with his nonfiction work, he has written four texts for musical compositions and numerous novels.

His book Un fauteuil sur la Seine briefly recounts the lives of those who preceded him in seat #29 as a member of the Académie française.

Awards
Maalouf has been awarded honorary doctorates by the Catholic University of Louvain (Belgium), the American University of Beirut (Lebanon), the Rovira i Virgili University (Spain), the University of Évora (Portugal), and the University of Ottawa (Canada).

In 1993, Maalouf was awarded the Prix Goncourt for his novel The Rock of Tanios (French: Le rocher de Tanios), set in 19th-century Lebanon. In 2004, the original, French edition of his Origins: A Memoir (Origines, 2004) won the Prix Méditerranée.

In 2010 he received the Spanish Prince of Asturias Award for Literature for his work, an intense mix of suggestive language, historic affairs in a Mediterranean mosaic of languages, cultures and religions and stories of tolerance and reconciliation. He was elected a member of the Académie française on 23 June 2011 to fill seat 29, left vacant by the death of anthropologist Claude Lévi-Strauss. Maalouf is the first person of Lebanese heritage to receive that honor.

In 2016, he won the Sheikh Zayed Book Award for "Cultural Personality of the Year", the premier category with a prize of 1 million dirhams (approx. US$272,000).

In 2020, he was awarded the National Order of Merit by the French government. He was given the honor by President Emmanuel Macron.

In 2021, he was elected a Royal Society of Literature International Writer.

Honours and decorations

Works

Fiction
Maalouf's novels are marked by his experiences of civil war and migration. Their characters are itinerant voyagers between lands, languages, and religions and he prefers to write about "our past."

Non-fiction

Librettos
All Maalouf's librettos have been written for the Finnish composer Kaija Saariaho.
 2000. L'Amour de loin ('Love from Afar'), opera
 2003. Adriana Mater, opera
 2006. La Passion de Simone, oratorio
 2010. Émilie, monodrama

References

External links
 Amin Maalouf blog
 

Writers from Beirut
1949 births
Exophonic writers
Living people
Members of the Académie Française
Prix Goncourt winners
Prix Maison de la Presse winners
Lebanese historical novelists
Lebanese non-fiction writers
French historical novelists
French opera librettists
20th-century Lebanese writers
21st-century Lebanese writers
20th-century French novelists
20th-century French male writers
French male novelists
French male non-fiction writers
Lebanese male writers
Collège Notre Dame de Jamhour alumni
Saint Joseph University alumni
Chevaliers of the Légion d'honneur
Knights First Class of the Order of the Lion of Finland
Officers of the Order of Cultural Merit (Monaco)
Commandeurs of the Ordre des Arts et des Lettres
Commanders of the Ordre national du Mérite
Grand Cordons of the National Order of the Cedar
Lebanese Melkite Greek Catholics
French Eastern Catholics
Lebanese emigrants to France
Lebanese people of Egyptian descent
Lebanese people of Turkish descent
French people of Egyptian descent
French people of Turkish descent
Lebanese memoirists